Fanucchi is an Italian surname. Notable people with the surname include:

Guillaume Fanucchi (born 1995), French footballer
Jacopo Fanucchi (born 1981), Italian footballer
Peter Fanucchi, American winemaker

Italian-language surnames
Surnames of Italian origin